Gnophodes betsimena, the banded evening brown, is a butterfly of the family Nymphalidae. It is found in southern Africa.

The wingspan is 55–65 mm for males and 60–70 mm for females. Adults are probably on wing year round, but usually from March to August (with peaks from April to June).

The larvae feed on various grasses, including Ehrharta erecta, Panicum deustum, and Setaria species.

Subspecies
Gnophodes betsimena betsimena (Madagascar)
Gnophodes betsimena parmeno Doubleday, [1849] (western Kenya (west of the Rift Valley) to Ethiopia, Uganda, southern Sudan, Zaire, Angola, Cameroon, West Africa)
Gnophodes betsimena diversa Butler, 1880 (eastern Cape to KwaZulu-Natal, Mozambique, eastern Zimbabwe, Malawi, Tanzania, eastern Kenya, northern Kenya (Mount Marsabit)) - yellow banded evening brown

References

Seitz, A. Die Gross-Schmetterlinge der Erde 13: Die Afrikanischen Tagfalter. Plate XIII 26

Butterflies described in 1833
Melanitini